Fairview DART depot is a railway depot used for servicing electrical multiple units on the Dublin Area Rapid Transit system.

Facilities
There is a three road shed, train wash and sidings. It is located just south of Clontarf Road DART station on the Dublin-Belfast railway line. However, maintenance on DART units is also carried out at Inchicore Works. There is no wheel lathe at the depot and as a result, out of service Commuter (29000 Class) DMUs tow DART trains to the Drogheda Commuter depot in order to receive new wheels.

Fleet serviced at the depot
 8100 Class
 8500, 8510 and 8520 Classes

Driver changes
This depot is also used for the change of drivers on the DART line – much to the dissatisfaction of northside commuters, as the depot is 50 metres from the platform at Clontarf Road Station, making it arguably a more logical point at which to change drivers. Recent cost-benefit analysis has determined that this inefficiency costs the Irish economy c. €750,000 per annum in lost time.

See also 
Dublin Area Rapid Transit
Multiple Units of Ireland

Rail infrastructure in Ireland
1950 establishments in Ireland